Stammheim – Die Baader-Meinhof-Gruppe vor Gericht (Stammheim – The Baader-Meinhof Gang on Trial) is a 1986 West German film directed by Reinhard Hauff. It tells the story of the trial in the court of Stammheim Prison of the left-wing Baader-Meinhof Group.

Selected cast
Ulrich Pleitgen as Presiding Judge
Ulrich Tukur as Andreas Baader
Therese Affolter as Ulrike Meinhof
Sabine Wegner as Gudrun Ensslin
Hans Kremer as Jan-Carl Raspe

Awards
The film won the FIPRESCI Prize and the Golden Bear at the 36th Berlin International Film Festival in 1986.

References

External links

1986 films
1986 drama films
German drama films
West German films
1980s German-language films
Biographical films about people convicted on terrorism charges
Films about terrorism in Europe
Films set in West Germany
Films directed by Reinhard Hauff
Cultural depictions of the Red Army Faction
Golden Bear winners
German courtroom films
Films set in 1975
Films set in 1976
Films set in 1977
1980s German films